The 2009 election for Mayor of Los Angeles took place on March 3, 2009. Incumbent mayor Antonio R. Villaraigosa was re-elected overwhelming and faced no serious opponent. Villaraigosa would have faced a run-off against second place-finisher Walter Moore had he failed to win a majority of the vote. Villaraigosa won the election despite having generally unfavorable approval ratings. He was credited with winning because more well-known and better-funded candidates, such as developer Rick Caruso, declined to run.

Municipal elections in California, including Mayor of Los Angeles, are officially nonpartisan; candidates' party affiliations do not appear on the ballot.

Results

References and footnotes

External links
 Office of the City Clerk, City of Los Angeles

Mayoral election, 2009
2009 California elections
2009
Los Angeles